Life on Display: Revolutionizing U.S. Museums of Science and Natural History in the Twentieth Century is a history of modern American science education and its relationship with museums of science. It was written by Karen A. Rader and Victoria E. M. Cain and published by the University of Chicago Press in 2014.

References

External links 

 
 Introduction

2014 non-fiction books
American history books
History books about education
Science education in the United States
Museum education
University of Chicago Press books
English-language books
History books about science